The 1971 Railway Cup Hurling Championship was the 45th staging of the Railway Cup since its establishment by the Gaelic Athletic Association in 1927. The championship ended on 17 March 1971.

Munster were the defending champions.

On 17 March 1971, Leinster won the championship following a 2–17 to 2–12 defeat of Munster in the final. This was their 12th Railway Cup title and their first since 1967.

Leinster's Eddie Keher was the Railway Cup top scorer with 0-18.

Results

Preliminary round

Semi-final

Final

Scoring statistics

Top scorers overall

Top scorers in a single game

Bibliography

 Donegan, Des, The Complete Handbook of Gaelic Games (DBA Publications Limited, 2005).

References

Railway Cup Hurling Championship
1971 in hurling